King G. Staples (May 26, 1851 – September 21, 1910) was an American businessman and Republican politician.

Born in Lee, Maine, Staples moved to Minnesota in 1855 and then moved to South Range, Wisconsin in 1884 and then to Iron River, Wisconsin in 1889. He was in the flour mill and lumbering businesses.

Staples served as treasurer of the town of Superior and as chairman of the Iron River Town Board in 1892. Staples also served on the Bayfield County Board of Supervisors and was chairman of the county board.

In 1897, Staples served in the Wisconsin State Assembly and was a Republican. In 1898 he was imprisoned for larceny. A year later, he was he was pardoned. Staples died in Portland, Oregon and was buried in Anoka, Minnesota.

Notes

External links

1851 births
1910 deaths
People from Penobscot County, Maine
People from Bayfield County, Wisconsin
Businesspeople from Wisconsin
County supervisors in Wisconsin
Wisconsin city council members
Mayors of places in Wisconsin
Republican Party members of the Wisconsin State Assembly
Wisconsin politicians convicted of crimes
19th-century American politicians
19th-century American businesspeople